WNT or Wnt may refer to:

Windows NT
WNT (Women's National Team)
Wnt signaling pathway, a complex protein network
 The Weymouth New Testament (1902), translation by Richard Francis Weymouth
ABC World News Tonight, ABC News' flagship evening news program
Woordenboek der Nederlandsche Taal, a Dutch dictionary, the most extensive in the world
Washington Naval Treaty, a 1922 naval arms limitation treaty
Wandsworth Town railway station, London; National Rail station code
 Scientific-Technical Publishers, Wydawnictwa Naukowo-Techniczne in Poland